Hranush Alexis "Hrush" Achemyan (born July 19, 1987) is an Armenian-American celebrity make-up artist and beauty influencer.

Early life
Achemyan was born as Hranush Alexis Achemyan in the Armenian Soviet Socialist Republic of the Soviet Union. After the dissolution of the Soviet Union, Achemyan immigrated with her family to the United States when she was five years old. Achemyan first began painting, which then led her to being a self-taught make-up artist.

Career
She started her make-up stylist career in 2006, with forming the Le Rush company in California, in 2008, which is now Styled by Hrush. Achemyan has since gone on to style most of the Kardashians and Jenners, namely Kylie Jenner and Kim Kardashian. Her career has led to a make-up touring business, such as the Alter Ego Tour.

Fashion design
Achemyan has become a designer of clothing, making two lines of clothes.

Music
In 2019, Achemyan released her debut single "Wish em Well" along with its music video uploaded on her YouTube channel.

Personal life
She resides in the Los Angeles, California area, where she operates her business.

In 2020, Achemyan used her platform to raise awareness about the Nagorno Karabakh war between Armenia and Azerbaijan and called for international action to stop Azerbaijan from shelling civilian areas of Artsakh and urged international community to recognize Artsakh's independence. A relative of her from Armenia, Garik Achemyan, died in the war.

References

External links

1987 births
Living people
American make-up artists
Armenian emigrants to the United States